Sidhra is a town and municipality in the city of Jammu in the Indian Union Territory of Jammu and Kashmir.

Geography 
Sidhra is located on the foothills of the Shivalik Hills and is situated on the banks of the Tawi River. Srinagar Jammu National Highway or NH-44 goes through this town. The Tawi Bridge connects it with Old City, while the highway from the opposite direction connects it with the new city.

Demographics 
Sidhra town is home to many Kashmiri and Pahari Muslim migrants mostly from Kashmir Valley, Chenab Valley and Poonch and Rajouri districts. Many Muslims from Kashmir Valley have settled here because of unrest in the Kashmir Valley. People from Chenab Valley and other hills of Jammu Division have settled here for better facilities and education. Some Kashmiri & Ladakhi Muslims have made this area their second home or winter home. They settle here for six months during winters and go back during summers.

Major colonies and settlements 
Sidhra comes under Ward No.71 of Jammu Municipal Corporation.It falls under the jammu east constituency replacing the Nagrota constituency. Tawi Vihar is the most developed Colony of Sidhra and home to bureaucrats, ministers and other high-ranking officials of J&K. It 
provides the residents with good electricity facilities, provisional store and greenery. The colony also has well lit roads and ample parks for leisure and exercise. The colony houses many people from srinagar and ladakh and is connected with the highway as well as the old city.  Asrarabad is the most populated colony of Sidhra but lacks maintained roads and other basic facilities.
Following are some colonies of Sidhra.

1.Tawi Vihar Colony

2.Asrarabad

3.Umar Colony

4.Fatehabad

5.Waliabad

6.Shahdab Colony

7.Bhatti Enclave

8.Neher

9.Jalalabad

10.Chinar Enclave

11.Iqbal Colony

12.Rangoora

13.Mahjeen

14.Jama Masjid Colony

Notable people who have residence in Sidhra

Abdul Samad (Cricketer)

Mubarak Gul (former MLA from Eid Gah Constituency]]

References 

Cities and towns in Jammu district